Hot Springs National Cemetery is a United States National Cemetery in the city of Hot Springs in Fall River County, South Dakota. It encompasses , and as of 2014, had 1,501 interments. The United States Department of Veterans Affairs manages it through the Black Hills National Cemetery.

History 
In 1902 a veterans care facility was constructed in the area, and the cemetery was established to inter veterans who died while residing there. It was transferred to the National Cemetery system in 1973.

Hot Springs National Cemetery was listed on the National Register of Historic Places in 1974.

Notable interments 
 Lieutenant Charles L. Russell (1844–1910), Medal of Honor recipient for action at the Battle of Spotsylvania Court House during the Civil War.

References

External links 
 National Cemetery Administration
 Hot Springs National Cemetery
 
 
 

Cemeteries in South Dakota
Protected areas of Fall River County, South Dakota
United States national cemeteries
Historic American Landscapes Survey in South Dakota